Davis Island is a large island located in the Mississippi River. It lies mostly in Warren County in the state of Mississippi but is also partly in Madison Parish, in the state of Louisiana. It is located about 20 miles southwest of Vicksburg, Mississippi, USA.

It was formerly a peninsula known as Davis Bend, with an  area of rich bottomlands, bounded on three sides by the Mississippi River.

Before the American Civil War, Joseph Davis developed his  Hurricane Plantation for cotton production on the peninsula. He worked to develop a model slave community, providing more autonomy to his slaves, for instance allowing them to keep a certain portion of monies they earned. He bought the land in 1818. In the 1830s he allowed his much younger brother (by 23 years), future Confederate President Jefferson Davis, the use of an adjoining . There, the younger Davis developed Brierfield Plantation. Joseph never gave the younger Davis title to that land, which caused legal problems after his death in 1870. 

The peninsula was separated from the mainland by a shift in the river in March 1867, after which it was an island accessible only by water. After the war, Davis provided a mortgage to Ben Montgomery, his former slave who had managed his plantation, and other freedmen, to acquire both plantations. They operated them for several years, but declining cotton prices, economic hard times in the financial panic, and the repeated flooding caused failure. Davis heirs foreclosed on the note, forcing Montgomery descendants and others to leave the island.

After several years of litigation, in 1878 Jefferson Davis gained legal possession of Brierfield plantation from his brother's heirs. He never lived at the plantation again; both he and other Davis family members leased the properties to tenant farmers. Their only access was by water.

This had the unintended consequence of increasing the severity of flooding of Davis Island. It has been under water more than once. The Davis family finally sold the properties in 1953, and the private Brierfield Hunting Club has controlled most of the island since then. Access is only by water.

References

Further reading
Frank E. Everett, Jr., Brierfield: Plantation Home of Jefferson Davis (1971)

External links
 Brian Hamilton, "Davis Island: A Confederate Shrine, Submerged", Edge Effects, 9 October 2014, University of Wisconsin-Madison

River islands of Louisiana
River islands of Mississippi
Landforms of Madison Parish, Louisiana
Landforms of Warren County, Mississippi
Islands of the Mississippi River